Oscar Baylin Goodman (born July 26, 1939) is an American attorney and politician. A Democrat-turned-independent, Goodman was the mayor of Las Vegas, Nevada from 1999 to 2011. His wife, Carolyn Goodman, succeeded him as mayor in 2011.

Early life and education 
Goodman was born and raised in a Jewish family in Philadelphia. After attending Central High School for a time, he graduated from The Haverford School, Haverford College, and received his J.D. degree from the University of Pennsylvania Law School. He and his wife Carolyn have four children.

Career

Defense attorney 
During his career as a defense attorney, Goodman represented defendants accused of being some of the leading organized crime figures in Las Vegas, such as: Meyer Lansky, Nicky Scarfo, Herbert "Fat Herbie" Blitzstein, Phil Leonetti, former Stardust Casino boss Frank "Lefty" Rosenthal, and Jamiel "Jimmy" Chagra, a 1970s drug trafficker who was acquitted of ordering the murder of Federal Judge John H. Wood, Jr. One of his notorious clients was reputed Chicago mobster Anthony "Tony the Ant" Spilotro, who was known to have a short and violent temper. In the semi-factual 1995 movie Casino, the character of Nicky Santoro was based on Spilotro, and was portrayed by actor Joe Pesci. Goodman had a cameo appearance in the film as himself, where he was depicted defending “Ace Rothstein,” a character closely based on Lefty Rosenthal, and played by Robert De Niro.

Goodman also represented former San Diego Mayor Roger Hedgecock, who was convicted of accepting illegal campaign contributions, and eventually forced to resign. Hedgecock was later cleared of all charges on appeal. Goodman was a senior partner in the law firm of Goodman & Chesnoff.

Civil service 
In 1964, Goodman and his wife became active in the local Jewish federation soon after they moved to Las Vegas. Carolyn eventually served as head of the federation's women's divisions.

Through the years of 1980–81, he served as president of the National Association of Criminal Defense Lawyers. Goodman was also a member of the Las Vegas Convention and Visitors Authority.

Mayor of Las Vegas (1999–2011)

Elections 
On June 8, 1999, Goodman was elected mayor of Las Vegas after he received 63.76% (32,765) of the votes, while his opponent, then-Las Vegas City Councilman Arnie Adamsen, received 36.24% (18,620). In 2003, Goodman was re-elected to a second four-year term , and defeated five opponents after he received 85.72% (29,356) of the votes. On April 3, 2007, he was re-elected to a third and final term, with 83.69% (26,845) of the votes, and once again defeated five opponents. Despite having been called Las Vegas’ “most popular mayor,” the city has term limit laws that restrict mayors to a maximum of three terms. In 2011, Carolyn Goodman was elected to succeed her husband as mayor, after she earned 60% of the votes.

Tenure 
On June 28, 1999, Goodman was the first mayor of Las Vegas to have his image placed on $5 and $25 casino chips issued by a Las Vegas casino. The two chips were issued by the Four Queens Hotel and Casino in Downtown Las Vegas. In 2006, the Four Queens put out a $200 Silver Strike with the likeness of Goodman on it.

Goodman has been vocal about having a Major League Baseball team relocate to Las Vegas. In 2004, the city failed to secure a move by the Montreal Expos to the city. Instead, the team relocated to Washington, D.C., and became the Washington Nationals. Later that year, Goodman met with officials of the Florida Marlins. The Chicago White Sox had considered a move, but negotiations failed after Chicago officials provided incentives for the team to stay.

Goodman worked to get a National Football League team to relocate to Las Vegas. On April 24, 2006, he called the San Diego Chargers, and asked if they would be interested in moving. Because of a contract, the city could not talk about a possible move. On January 4, 2007, he called again, since the team was not allowed to talk to other cities about a possible move. Again, Goodman was turned down “for the time being.” According to Mark Fabiani, the Chargers’ general counsel, Goodman was a longtime season ticket holder of the Chargers, and a fan of the team. The Chargers ultimately decided to relocate to Los Angeles instead. In 2017, under the tenure of Carolyn Goodman as mayor, the Oakland Raiders agreed to relocate to Las Vegas.

In 2003, Goodman was voted the “Least Effective Public Official” in the Review-Journal'''s annual reader's poll.

In July 2006 Goodman criticized the Ubisoft game Tom Clancy's Rainbow Six: Vegas for its premise of terrorism in Las Vegas, because he thought it may tarnish the city's image. He stated, "It's based on a false premise.... It could be harmful economically, and it may be something that's not entitled to free speech (protection).... I will ask... whether or not we can stop it." In 2009 and 2010, Goodman was angered by President Barack Obama's allegedly negative remarks about Las Vegas.

After winning the mayoral election in 2007, Goodman, like his counterpart Michael Bloomberg in New York City, looked into a means to change the city charter to remove term limits. He ultimately did not pursue changes to Las Vegas law.

Currently, prostitution is legal in Nevada only in rural counties with fewer than 400,000 residents, a requirement which excludes Clark County and the city of Las Vegas from allowing the practice. Goodman supports legalizing prostitution in the city's downtown area as a revenue generator and tool for revitalization. Some journalists have criticized this position.

 Ethics investigation 
In February 2004, Robert Rose, an ethics watchdog, filed a complaint with the Nevada Commission on Ethics claiming that during the U.S. Conference of Mayors, Goodman handed out to fellow mayors, conference attendees and other political figures invitations to a cocktail party Goodman was hosting. Rose alleged that this was nothing more than the mayor abusing his power of office to help promote a business that is owned by his son, Ross Goodman, and Las Vegas Councilman Michael Mack. The Nevada Ethics Commission opened an investigation on April 14, 2004, and on May 13, 2004, the members of the commission found the mayor in ethics violations, although no fine was rendered. Goodman sued the commission and won; the commission's ruling was reversed by the court.

On September 16, 2004, Rose again filed a complaint with the Nevada Commission on Ethics, this time asking the commission to clarify Goodman's affiliation with his son Ross's law firm. In a statement, the mayor explained his name on the letterhead is a way of informing out of state law firms that Ross Goodman is his son. However, a person serving as an elected public official in Nevada may not have his name listed on a law firm letterhead, and Goodman removed his name under protest after several newspaper articles noted the infraction.

On July 18, 2005, the Nevada Commission on Ethics concluded insufficient cause for a hearing and recommended the allegations be dismissed, clearing Goodman of the ethics complaint regarding his name listed as "Of Counsel" to Goodman Law Group.

On September 11, 2007, the Supreme Court of Nevada ruled that Goodman did not violate any ethics laws during the 2004 cocktail party that he hosted on behalf of his son Ross C. Goodman.

 Post-mayoral career 
Goodman currently serves as Of Counsel to Goodman Law Group, a Las Vegas law firm formed by his son, Ross C. Goodman.

His memoir, Being Oscar: From Mob Lawyer to Mayor of Las Vegas, written with George Anastasia, was published in 2013.

 Speculation of future campaigns 
Goodman had entertained the idea of seeking the Democratic nomination in the 2006 United States Senate election in Nevada, in order to run against incumbent Republican Senator John Ensign. He ultimately announced that he would not run for the nomination, which went to Jack Carter, the son of President Jimmy Carter.

Goodman fueled speculation that he might run as an independent in the 2010 Nevada gubernatorial election against incumbent Republican Jim Gibbons and presumptive Democratic candidate Rory Reid. However, Goodman decided not to run for governor, citing his desire to stay close to his family, and objections to moving to Carson City.<ref>Powers, Ashley (January 25, 2010), Las Vegas Mayor Oscar Goodman decides not to go for Nevada governor. "Los Angeles Times http://latimesblogs.latimes.com/washington/2010/01/oscar-goodman-nevada-governor.html</ref>

Las Vegas commentator Dayvid Figler wrote in 2009 that Goodman might become the first Jewish president of the United States.

In popular culture 

Goodman appeared as himself in the 1995 Martin Scorsese film Casino. Later on, he made another brief appearance in the film Looney Tunes: Back in Action in the DVD extras. In 2006, he appeared as himself in the Direct-to-DVD film Bachelor Party Vegas, and made another brief appearance on the DVD version of Looney Tunes: Back in Action.

In 2000, a bobblehead doll of Goodman was issued as a promotion during a Las Vegas 51s baseball game.

As a celebrity photographer for the Playboy Cyber Club, Goodman shot a topless pictorial of Miss January 2001 Irina Voronina for the website.

In 2002, Goodman became a spokesman for Bombay Sapphire gin. He donated his $100,000 salary to charity, including $50,000 to The Meadows School founded by his wife. He would later generate controversy in 2005 when he joked about his love of the gin before an elementary school class.

In 2003, Las Vegas Review-Journal columnist John L. Smith wrote a book chronicling Goodman's life, titled Of Rats and Men: Oscar Goodman's Life from Mob Mouthpiece to Mayor of Las Vegas.

Goodman guest-starred as himself three times on the CBS series CSI. The episodes Goodman was featured in included: “Sqweegel,” where he defended Ann-Margret's character from being harassed by the LVPD; “Maid Man,” where he first appeared at the opening of the Mob Museum, which was re-created for the show in advance of its opening; and “Last Rollout,” as a lawyer for a suspect during an interrogation.

Goodman was interviewed for the television programs The Making of the Mob: New York and The Making of the Mob: Chicago in 2015 and 2016, respectively.

Bibliography 
 Being Oscar: From Mob Lawyer to Mayor of Las Vegas (2013)

See also 
 List of mayors of Las Vegas, Nevada

Notes

References 

 Goodman rules out Senate bid (Las Vegas Review Journal)
 "Former Mob Lawyer Elected Las Vegas Mayor", Reuters, June 1999

External links
 
 "Mob Trial Riles Las Vegas," APBnews.com, May 17, 1999 by Cathy Scott

1939 births
Living people
Chicago Outfit
Haverford College alumni
Jewish mayors of places in the United States
Jewish American people in Nevada politics
Mayors of Las Vegas
Nevada Democrats
Nevada Independents
Nevada lawyers
Politicians from Las Vegas
Politicians from Philadelphia
First ladies and gentlemen of Las Vegas
University of Pennsylvania Law School alumni
21st-century American Jews
American people of Italian descent
Central High School (Philadelphia) alumni